Mediterranean shearwater Puffinus mauretanicus sensu lato was the name used during the 1990s for what was then regarded as a polytypic species of Puffinus shearwater, but which is now regarded as two separate monotypic species:

 Balearic shearwater, Puffinus mauretanicus
 Yelkouan shearwater, Puffinus yelkouan

Puffinus